Norbert Grupe (born August 25, 1940 – March 10, 2004), better known outside Germany by his stage name Wilhelm von Homburg, was a German boxer, actor, and professional wrestler known for his villainous supporting roles in various high-profile films of the 1980s and 1990s, including Vigo the Carpathian in Ghostbusters II, the henchman James in Die Hard, and Souteneur in Werner Herzog's Stroszek.

Early life
Norbert Grupe was born in Berlin on August 25, 1940. He was the son of Richard Grupe (1915 - August 5, 1988), who worked as a baker in Nazi Germany, and later become both a championship-winning boxer and a local policeman who worked at the Buchenwald concentration camp. Richard would later say of this period, "I was never a Nazi. I never joined the party. I was not in the Hitler Youth...I was a pastryman...I have no much luck with the Jewish people. But I never hated them. Never hated them. I'm very sorry for what Hitler did to the Jewish people." 
After the war, Richard boxed professionally from 1946 to 1952, earning a record of 26 wins (20 by knockout), 8 losses, and 6 draws. He then toured Europe as a wrestler. Later, Richard's first wife gave birth to Grupe's brother Winfried.  Richard's second wife Ursula, much younger and closer in age to Grupe himself, gave birth to Grupe's sister, Rona.  Ursula left the family five years later. According to Rona, Grupe exhibited a bitter jealousy toward Winfried, because Winfried's mother was a daily presence for him, whereas Grupe's absent mother would not even speak to him.

Career

Early work and professional wrestling
In his youth, Grupe worked as a meatpacker, stevedore, butcher, longshoreman, and a waiter. By the time he finished school, Grupe, who had begun training in boxing at age 10, had won several amateur boxing matches. Around 1960, Richard emigrated to the United States to further wrestling career, and Grupe, who stood at 6'3" and 227 pounds by this time, would soon follow, spending time at California's notable Venice weight pen, where he became acquainted with future film star Arnold Schwarzenegger. The father and son duo would don Viking costumes, with which they were billed as the tag-team by the name of The Vikings, wrestling at the Los Angeles Coliseum and Madison Square Garden. They subsequently changed their name to the Von Homburg Brothers, under which they performed as heels for less than a hundred dollars a night in total. Grupe thought his last name sounded too much like the word groupie, and changed it to Prince Wilhelm von Homburg. He sometimes wore a monocle and German eagle. He would later regret using it in Hollywood, saying, "In an industry that was ruled by the Jews, it was really dumb to call myself 'von Homburg.' Who do they think that is? A Nazi nobleman." After their wrestling partnership ended, the father and son grew estranged.

Boxing career and early acting roles
Von Homburg switched careers to boxing in 1962, employing the showmanship and the boastful, cocky persona he had developed as a wrestler. He won 16 of 21 professional fights in the U.S., fighting throughout California as a light heavyweight before traveling across the U.S. and then his native Germany where his he wore fur coats, smoked cigars, and taunted referees and crowds in a way that stunned the normally sedate German boxing world. One reporter for Der Spiegel ranked Von Homburg as seventh in the world. He grew his blonde hair over his ears, for which he was nicknamed the "Beatle Boxer."
 
Von Homburg got his first championship match in 1966 against Piero del Papa for the EBU Regional Light Heavyweight title in Berlin. Homburg was disqualified in the eleventh round, after having knocked out Del Papa, because the referee declared a subtle head movement by Von Homburg to have been an illegal headbutt. The match would haunt Von Homburg for the rest of his life, and he was blame it on bias on the part of the referee, saying, "I was the best thing German boxing had back then, and then I had a 70-year-old Frenchman as the referee. We all know what the Germans did to his parents and his sister."

Throughout his boxing career, von Homburg appeared in bit roles in various films and television shows, usually billed as Wilhelm von Homburg. In "The Promoter", the April 25, 1964 episode of Gunsmoke for example, he played a boxer named Otto who is offered a large bribe to throw a fight.

After losing his next three fights, von Homburg retired from boxing in 1970 at age 30, and went to live in St. Pauli Kiez, a red-light district of Hamburg, developing a reputation in that area's underground, where he associated with pimps and Hells Angels, and had engaged in a number of affairs with both men and women. He also used drugs and alcohol to excess.

Acting
After spending some years in prison, von Homburg attempted to pursue an acting career in earnest. German director Werner Herzog, who had seen him box in his youth, cast him as a bullying pimp in his 1977 film Stroszek. Herzog commented, "The Prince was so clear and intelligent and radiated, at the same time, a feeling of danger that absolutely terrified me. He was almost like a German Mike Tyson." A decade later, Von Homburg was cast as James, one of Hans Gruber's henchmen in the 1988 action thriller Die Hard, who dies after Bruce Willis' character detonates plastic explosives down an elevator shaft. Von Homburg's biggest role came at age 50, when he was cast as the primary villain in the 1989 comedy sequel Ghostbusters II, playing Vigo the Carpathian, a despotic sorcerer whose soul is released from a medieval painting. The character's full name was Vigo Von Homburg Deutschendorf, which paid homage to the name he had chosen as a performer. The film was released less than a year after Von Homburg's father Richard died, though he had not reconciled with his father or sister. His last major role was as Charles Macum Diggs, a vegetative ex-boxer in Diggstown, which was a commercial flop.

Later life and death 
Von Homburg spent the last years of his life effectively homeless, alternating between sleeping at a YMCA, in the homes of friends, or in his van. He developed prostate cancer, and following its metastasis to his pelvis, spine, and brain, he went to the home of his friend Walter Staudinger, where he spent his final days.

Professional boxing record

|-
|align="center" colspan=8|30 Wins (24 knockouts, 6 decisions), 11 Losses (2 knockouts, 8 decisions, 1 DQ), 6 Draws
|-
| align="center" style="border-style: none none solid solid; background: #e3e3e3"|Result
| align="center" style="border-style: none none solid solid; background: #e3e3e3"|Record
| align="center" style="border-style: none none solid solid; background: #e3e3e3"|Opponent
| align="center" style="border-style: none none solid solid; background: #e3e3e3"|Type
| align="center" style="border-style: none none solid solid; background: #e3e3e3"|Round
| align="center" style="border-style: none none solid solid; background: #e3e3e3"|Date
| align="center" style="border-style: none none solid solid; background: #e3e3e3"|Location
| align="center" style="border-style: none none solid solid; background: #e3e3e3"|Notes
|-align=center
|Loss
|
|align=left| Rüdiger Schmidtke
|PTS
|10
|December 11, 1970
|align=left| Cologne, North Rhine-Westphalia
|align=left|
|-
|Loss
|
|align=left| Jürgen Blin
|PTS
|10
|December 12, 1969
|align=left| Sporthalle, Cologne, North Rhine-Westphalia
|align=left|
|-
|Loss
|
|align=left| Rüdiger Schmidtke
|PTS
|10
|November 14, 1969
|align=left| Festhalle Frankfurt, Frankfurt, Hesse
|align=left|
|-
|Loss
|
|align=left| Oscar Bonavena
|TKO
|3
|June 20, 1969
|align=left| Sportpalast, Schoeneberg, Berlin
|align=left|
|-
|Win
|
|align=left| Giulio Rinaldi
|TKO
|7
|April 2, 1969
|align=left| Sportpalast, Schoeneberg, Berlin
|align=left|
|-
|Loss
|
|align=left| Giulio Rinaldi
|PTS
|10
|February 14, 1969
|align=left| Ernst Merck Halle, Hamburg
|align=left|
|-
|Win
|
|align=left| Giulio Rinaldi
|TKO
|5
|January 3, 1969
|align=left| Sportpalast, Schoeneberg, Berlin
|align=left|
|-
|Win
|
|align=left| Gerhard Zech
|PTS
|10
|November 8, 1968
|align=left| Ernst Merck Halle, Hamburg
|align=left|
|-
|Win
|
|align=left| Franklin Arrindel
|KO
|3
|September 18, 1968
|align=left| Hohe Warte Stadium, Vienna
|align=left|
|-
|Win
|
|align=left| Rudolf Nehring
|TKO
|8
|August 30, 1968
|align=left| Sportpalast, Schoeneberg, Berlin
|align=left|
|-
|Loss
|
|align=left| David E. Bailey
|PTS
|10
|April 11, 1968
|align=left| Sportpalast, Schoeneberg, Berlin
|align=left|
|-
|Win
|
|align=left| Paul Roux
|KO
|5
|December 15, 1967
|align=left| Circus Krone Building, Munich, Bavaria
|align=left|
|-
|Draw
|
|align=left| Ray Patterson
|PTS
|10
|May 3, 1967
|align=left| Westfalenhallen, Dortmund, North Rhine-Westphalia
|align=left|
|-
|Win
|
|align=left| Archie McBride
|KO
|9
|December 9, 1966
|align=left| Festhalle Frankfurt, Frankfurt, Hesse
|align=left|
|-
|Loss
|
|align=left| Piero Del Papa
|DQ
|11
|November 19, 1966
|align=left| Deutschlandhalle, Charlottenburg, Berlin
|align=left|
|-
|Draw
|
|align=left| Erich Schöppner
|PTS
|10
|May 14, 1966
|align=left| Westfalenhallen, Dortmund, North Rhine-Westphalia
|align=left|
|-
|Draw
|
|align=left| Archie McBride
|PTS
|10
|May 28, 1965
|align=left| Deutschlandhalle, Charlottenburg, Berlin
|align=left|
|-
|Win
|
|align=left| Bas van Duivenbode
|KO
|4
|April 29, 1965
|align=left| Neue Sporthalle, Hannover, Lower Saxony
|align=left|
|-
|Win
|
|align=left| Jose Angel Manzur
|TKO
|8
|April 2, 1965
|align=left| Stadthalle, Vienna
|align=left|
|-
|Win
|
|align=left| Ulli Ritter
|TKO
|6
|February 20, 1965
|align=left| Ostseehalle, Kiel, Schleswig-Holstein
|align=left|
|-
|Loss
|
|align=left| Piero Tomasoni
|PTS
|10
|January 16, 1965
|align=left| Westfalenhallen, Dortmund, North Rhine-Westphalia
|align=left|
|-
|Win
|
|align=left| Joseph Syoz
|TKO
|10
|December 5, 1964
|align=left| Sporthalle, Cologne, North Rhine-Westphalia
|align=left|
|-
|Win
|
|align=left| Paul Kraus
|KO
|3
|November 27, 1964
|align=left| Ostseehalle, Kiel, Schleswig-Holstein
|align=left|
|-
|Win
|
|align=left| Lars Olaf Norling
|TKO
|9
|November 6, 1964
|align=left| Ernst Merck Halle, Hamburg
|align=left|
|-
|Win
|
|align=left| Jean Huiban
|KO
|6
|May 29, 1964
|align=left| Weser-Ems Halle, Oldenburg, Lower Saxony
|align=left|
|-
|Draw
|
|align=left| Ulli Ritter
|PTS
|10
|May 8, 1964
|align=left| Ernst Merck Halle, Hamburg
|align=left|
|-
|Win
|
|align=left| Roy Crear
|KO
|5
|April 7, 1964
|align=left| Stockyards Coliseum, Oklahoma City
|align=left|
|-
|Win
|
|align=left| Bob McKinney
|TKO
|9
|January 6, 1964
|align=left| New York Coliseum, Bronx, New York
|align=left|
|-
|Win
|
|align=left| Monroe Ratliff
|SD
|10
|November 18, 1963
|align=left| Santa Monica Civic Auditorium, Santa Monica, California
|align=left|
|-
|Loss
|
|align=left| Billy Stephan
|PTS
|10
|September 19, 1963
|align=left| Olympic Auditorium, Los Angeles, California
|align=left|
|-
|Loss
|
|align=left| Chuck Leslie
|PTS
|10
|July 23, 1963
|align=left| San Diego Coliseum, San Diego, California
|align=left|
|-
|Win
|
|align=left| Bobby Sand
|TKO
|9
|June 24, 1963
|align=left| Moulin Rouge, Hollywood, California
|align=left|
|-
|Draw
|
|align=left| Tommy Merrill
|PTS
|6
|June 1, 1963
|align=left| Las Vegas Convention Center, Las Vegas, Nevada
|align=left|
|-
|Win
|
|align=left| Bobby Sand
|TKO
|9
|May 20, 1963
|align=left| Moulin Rouge, Hollywood, California
|align=left|
|-
|Win
|
|align=left| Pete Gonzales
|KO
|3
|March 25, 1963
|align=left| Moulin Rouge, Hollywood, California
|align=left|
|-
|Win
|
|align=left| Gus Calf Robe
|KO
|6
|February 25, 1963
|align=left| Moulin Rouge, Hollywood, California
|align=left|
|-
|Win
|
|align=left| Clifford Gray
|TKO
|1
|February 19, 1963
|align=left| San Diego Coliseum, San Diego, California
|align=left|
|-
|Win
|
|align=left| Bob Mumford
|KO
|6
|February 15, 1963
|align=left| Olympic Auditorium, Los Angeles, California
|align=left|
|-
|Win
|
|align=left| Yancy D Smith
|UD
|8
|January 22, 1963
|align=left| San Diego Coliseum, San Diego, California
|align=left|
|-
|Win
|
|align=left| Yancy D Smith
|PTS
|8
|January 15, 1963
|align=left| San Diego Coliseum, San Diego, California
|align=left|
|-
|Win
|
|align=left| Clifford Gray
|PTS
|6
|December 18, 1962
|align=left| San Diego Coliseum, San Diego, California
|align=left|
|-
|Win
|
|align=left| John L Davey
|PTS
|6
|December 14, 1962
|align=left| Olympic Auditorium, Los Angeles, California
|align=left|
|-
|Loss
|
|align=left| Freeman Hardin
|KO
|3
|October 25, 1962
|align=left| Olympic Auditorium, Los Angeles, California
|align=left|
|-
|Win
|
|align=left| Al Cummings
|KO
|3
|September 21, 1962
|align=left| Olympic Auditorium, Los Angeles, California
|align=left|
|-
|Win
|
|align=left| Tony Fern
|KO
|3
|August 24, 1962
|align=left| Olympic Auditorium, Los Angeles, California
|align=left|
|-
|Win
|
|align=left| Bob Brown
|KO
|2
|August 16, 1962
|align=left| San Diego Coliseum, San Diego, California
|align=left|
|-
|Draw
|
|align=left| Sam Wyatt
|PTS
|4
|July 20, 1962
|align=left| Los Angeles Sports Arena, Los Angeles, California
|align=left|
|}

Filmography

Film

Television

References

External links
 
 
 
 

1940 births
2004 deaths
20th-century German male actors
Bisexual men
Bisexual sportspeople
Deaths from cancer in Mexico
Deaths from prostate cancer
German male boxers
German male film actors
German male professional wrestlers
German male television actors
LGBT boxers
LGBT professional wrestlers
German LGBT sportspeople
Male actors from Berlin
Sportspeople from Berlin
Heavyweight boxers
20th-century German LGBT people